Rachel Hunter (born 7 June 1969) is a Canadian equestrian. She competed in two events at the 1992 Summer Olympics.

References

External links
 

1969 births
Living people
Canadian female equestrians
Olympic equestrians of Canada
Equestrians at the 1992 Summer Olympics
Place of birth missing (living people)